Pinus oocarpa is a species of pine tree native to Mexico and Central America. It is the national tree of Honduras, where it is known as ocote. Common names include ocote chino, pino amarillo, pino avellano, Mexican yellow pine, egg-cone pine and hazelnut pine. It appears that it was the progenitor (original) species that served as the ancestor for some of the other pines of Mexico.

Pinus oocarpa is the national tree of Honduras.

Habitat and range
This species ranges from latitudes of 14° to 29° north, including western Mexico, Guatemala and the higher elevations of Honduras, El Salvador and northwestern Nicaragua. In El Salvador, Honduras and Nicaragua it grows above .

Uses
It is an important source of commercial timber in Honduras and Central America. Pinus oocarpa was introduced for commercial production of wood for the paper industry: in Ecuador, Kenya, Zambia, Colombia, Bolivia, Queensland (Australia), Brazil and South Africa. Due to the amount of resin within the tree, many Central Americans will use small shavings to start cooking fires.

References

Eguiluz, T. 1982. Clima y Distribución del género pinus en México. Distrito Federal. Mexico. 
Rzedowski, J. 1983. Vegetación de México. Distrito Federal, Mexico. 
Dvorak, W. S., G. R. Hodge, E. A. Gutiérrez, L. F. Osorio, F. S. Malan and T. K. Stanger. *2000. Conservation and Testing of Tropical and Subtropical Forest Species by the CAMCORE Cooperative. College of Natural Resources, NCSU. Raleigh, NC. USA. 
Martínez, Maximinio. 1978. Catálogo de nombres vulgares y científicos de plantas mexicanas.

External links
Pinus oocarpa

oocarpa
Plants described in 1838
Least concern plants
Trees of El Salvador
Trees of Guatemala
Trees of Honduras
Trees of Northwestern Mexico
Trees of Southeastern Mexico
Trees of Southwestern Mexico
Trees of Nicaragua
Flora of the Sierra Madre Occidental
Flora of the Central American pine–oak forests
Flora of the Sierra Madre del Sur
Flora of the Sierra Madre de Oaxaca